The Battle of Saldanha Bay was a naval action that occurred off the Dutch Cape Colony on 21 July 1781 during the Fourth Anglo-Dutch War. A squadron of Royal Navy warships under the command of commodore George Johnstone captured five Dutch East India Company ships; her own crew destroyed a sixth. Casualties on the Dutch side were minimal if any, and there were no British casualties.

Background
Johnstone had been directed to capture the Dutch settlement at the Cape of Good Hope. However, France had learned of his mission, and the French admiral Bailli de Suffren frustrated the mission. Suffren was en route to the Indian Ocean, but the French marine ministry had warned him so he sought to reach the Cape before Johnstone. After an indecisive chance encounter (Battle of Porto Praya), between the two fleets in the Cape Verde Islands on 16 April 1781, Suffren sailed for the Cape while Johnstone remained at Porto Praya for repairs.  As a result, Johnstone found the Dutch settlement well defended when he arrived there in July and decided against an attack.

The Dutch governor Joachim van Plettenberg had, as a precaution, directed the westbound merchant fleet, laden with goods, to anchor in Saldanha Bay and wait for French escort but where they would be concealed from the British fleet. They were under orders to ground and burn their ships if the British were to appear; however they were not vigilant in their watches.

One of Johnstone's frigates, flying French colours, intercepted a Dutch merchantmen that had left the bay several days earlier, heading east. The Dutch vessel was the Held Woltemade, Vrolyk, master, which had sailed from Saldanha Bay on 28 June carrying stores and £40,000 in bullion to Ceylon. From Held Woltemade Johnstone learned of the whereabouts of the Dutch fleet.

Battle
Bearing off Saldanha Bay Johnstone sighted the Dutch fleet, and entered the bay flying French colors. He then raised the British ensign and opened fire, totally surprising the Dutch. The Dutch could not escape and decided to destroy their ships rather than let them fall into British hands. The Dutch cut their cables, loosed their top sails, and drove the vessels on shore. Once this was done they attempted to torch the ships, and the British, now in their boats, attempted to extinguish the fires. The British were successful, taking as prizes Dankbaerheid, Paerl, Honcoop, and Hoogcarspel. Middelburg, however, burnt furiously and was left alone. She blew up after very nearly colliding with two of the prizes.

Rattlesnake surprised and captured a hooker (a type of coastal craft), laden with the sails of the captured ships and hidden away behind Schapin (Schaapen) Island. The Dutch had put the sails on board and hidden the hooker to make seizing the Indiamen more difficult.

By the end of the day the British had captured another two hookers, which Johnstone could not easily remove. In order not to leave any marks of "barbarity towards a settlement where our wants had so often been relieved", he gave them back to the Dutch.

Aftermath
After the British Royal Navy captured the Dutch East Indiamen, a boat rowed out to meet the British warships. On board were the "kings of Ternate and Tidore, and the princes of the respective families". The Dutch had long held these captives on Isle Robin, but then had moved them to Saldanha Bay.

The British sent their prizes back to England. Only two reached their destination, and that with difficulty and after some fighting in the English Channel. A French frigate attacked Hoogcarspel, but she succeeded in getting to Mount's Bay where she was escorted. Also, two French privateers attacked Paerl, which succeeded in escaping. Dankbaerheid and Honcoop were lost in January 1782 as the result of a gale at the mouth of the Channel. The prize crew on Dankbaerheid  were able to escape and reached Lisbon in safety. Honcoop disappeared and was believed to have foundered with all hands.

The information below on the Dutch vessels captured at Saldhana Bay comes from Lloyd's List, van Niekerk, and Nieuwe Nederlandsche jaerboeken.

The British had insured their prizes so when Dankbaerheid and Honcoop were lost in transit to Britain the captors still benefited from the insurance money. The total prize money for Paerl and Hoogcarspel, which was divided between Johnstone's squadron and the Army under the command of General Sir William Meadows, amounted to £68,000.

Johnstone's squadron
Warships (per prize money announcements):
 (74)
 (64)
 (50)
 (50)
 (50)
 (36)
 (32)
 (28)
 (16; sloop)
 (16; sloop)
 (fireship)
 (bomb vessel)

In addition to the warships, the following armed transports also shared in the prize money for the Paerl and Hoogkarspel: San Carlos, Porpoise, Raikes, Royal Charlotte, Resolution, Manilla, and Pondicherry.

Notes, citations and references
Notes

Citations

References
 Clowes, Laird (1897) The royal navy: a history from the earliest times to the present:  Volume 4 London: S. Low, Marston and company.
 
 Potgieter, Thean, 'Maritime defence of the Cape of Good Hope, 1779-1803', Historia, Vol 48, No1.
 Webster, Roger The illustrated at the fireside: true South African stories.

External links
 http://www.sawestcoast.com/battle.html
 Battles of South Africa by Tim Couzens
 History and Ethnography of Africa South of the Zambesi, from the Settlement ... By George McCall Theal
 Briefwisseling oor Kaapse sake 1778-1792 (1982)–Hendrik Swellengrebel jr.

Conflicts in 1781
Naval battles of the Fourth Anglo-Dutch War
Naval battles involving Great Britain
Naval battles involving the Dutch Republic
1781 in South Africa
1781 in Africa